Gregorio Paltrinieri (born 5 September 1994) is an Italian competitive swimmer. He is a former world record holder in the short course 1500 metre freestyle. He holds the European record in the long course 800 metre and 1500 metre freestyle events with times of 7:39.27 and 14:32.80, respectively. In the 1500 metre freestyle, he is a 2016 Olympic, three-time world long course, two-time world short course, three-time European long course, and three-time European short course champion. In the 800 metre freestyle, he is a 2019 world long course, 2022 world short course, three-time European long course, and 2021 European short course champion. In the 10 kilometre open water swim, he is a 2022 world and 2020 European champion. In the 5 kilometre open water swim, he is a two-time European champion.

Swimming career

Paltrinieri started swimming at a very young age, and until the age of 12, he specialized in breaststroke. However, as he grew, he converted to freestyle, specializing in the longer pool distances.

2011: Junior
His first international success came as a 16-year-old at the 2011 European Junior Swimming Championships in Belgrade, where he won the 1500 metres gold and an 800 metres bronze. Having qualified for the World championships in Shanghai, he did not progress further than the heats, but a few weeks later at the World Junior Championships in Lima, Peru, he was back on the podium with a 1500 metres freestyle silver and an 800 metres bronze.

2012: Summer Olympics and European Champion
In March 2012 Paltrinieri won the Italian 800 metres freestyle title, and two months later, he left everyone in his wake at the European Championships in Debrecen, defeating renowned Hungarians Gergő Kis and Gergely Gyurta in the 1500 m. His time of 14:48.92 qualified him for the Olympics and, at the time, was the year's second-fastest 1500 m swim, breaking the championship record. He is trained by Stefano Morini. At 2012 Summer Olympics, the 17-year-old Italian advanced to his first Olympic final with the 4th fastest time of 14:50.11. In the final he finished 5th in 14:51.92.

At the end of 2012 Paltrinieri finished 2nd in the 1500 meter freestyle event at the 2012 FINA World Swimming Championships (25 m), and was later awarded a gold medal after a positive doping test for Danish swimmer Mads Glæsner. However, upon appeal to the Court of Arbitration for Sport, Glæsner's 1500-meter freestyle gold medal was reinstated based on the fact that a test after that race, two days after his initial positive test following the 400-meter free, was clean.  This means that Paltrinieri was returned to his silver medal position in the 1500 m freestyle.

2013 World Aquatics Championships
Paltrinieri competed for Italy at 2013 World Aquatics Championships. He reached his first 800 metres freestyle final at a long course world championship event finishing sixth in 7:50.29. In the 1500 metres freestyle event Paltrinieri won a bronze medal with a time of 14:45.38, establishing a new national record.

2014
In 2014 Paltrinieri at the Italian Swimming Championships in Riccione finished second in 800 metres freestyle event with a time of 7:43.01, behind Gabriele Detti who established a new European record in the distance. Three days later Paltrinieri established a new national record of 14:44.50 in the 1500 m freestyle event. The day before the meet, Paltrinieri had swum an unofficial world best time of 50:56.50 in the 5 km (long course pool) at the Italian indoor distance championships in Riccione.

In August, at the 2014 European Aquatics Championships, Paltrinieri won the 800 m and 1500 m freestyle events establishing the new European record of 14:39.93; with this result he became only the fifth swimmer ever to swim under 14:40.00 in the 1500 m freestyle long course. At the 2014 FINA World Swimming Championships (25 m) in Doha, Paltrinieri became World champion for the first time with the new European record of 14:16.10, which was also the second fastest time ever swum behind Grant Hackett's world record.

2015: World Champion and World Record Holder
At the 2015 World Aquatics Championships, in Kazan, Paltrinieri won the silver medal in the 800 m, losing to Sun Yang. Later he won the 1500 m, setting a new European record, a race in which Sun did not take part despite having qualified for the final with the second best time after Paltrinieri.

At the end of the year Paltrineri took part at the 2015 European Short Course Swimming Championships in Netanya (Israel); here he established a new 1500 metres freestyle world record of 14:08.06 winning the gold medal ahead fellow Italian and friend Gabriele Detti. The previous record set in 2001 by Grant Hackett was beaten by 2.04 seconds. With the gold medal, Paltrinieri also became the simultaneous holder of the world and European titles, in long course and short course, in the 1500 metres freestyle event.

2016: Olympic champion

At the 2016 Summer Olympics in Rio de Janeiro, Brazil, Paltrinieri won the gold medal in the 1500 metre freestyle in a time of 14:34.57, after qualifying for the final ranking first in the preliminaries with a time of 14:44.51. He shared the podium with fellow Italian Gabriele Detti, who won the bronze medal with a 14:40.86 to finish less than seven seconds behind Paltrinieri.

2017–2019
In 2017, Paltrinieri confirmed his World Championship gold medal in the 1500m freestyle at the 2017 World Aquatics Championships held in Budapest. He also won a bronze medal in the 800m race, won by teammate Gabriele Detti.

At the 2019 World Aquatics Championships in Gwangju, Paltrinieri won the gold medal in the 800 m, setting  the new European record in 7:39.27. Later, after two-straight world titles in the 1500 m, Paltinieri lost the race but ended with the bronze medal.
After placing 6th in the men’s 10 km in what was his first World Championships open water race, Paltrinieri won the silver medal in the mixed 5 km team relay.

2020
In August 2020 at the 57th Settecolli Trophy, Paltrinieri swam a time of 14:33.10 in the 1500m freestyle. This performance registered as the second-fastest swim ever (behind only the world record swim by Sun Yang), as well as a new European Record.

2021
At the European Championships in Budapest 2020, held in May 2021 due to the COVID-19 pandemic, Paltrinieri won three gold medals in the three races in which he participated in the open water, the 5 and 10 km and the team race. In the same event he also won double silver medal respectively in the 800m freestyle and in the 1500m freestyle.

In mid-June, with the 2020 Summer Olympics just one month away, Paltrinieri contracted mononucleosis and reduced significantly his pool training.
Despite the disrupted preparation, Paltrinieri won the silver medal in the 800m freestyle and the bronze medal in the 10 km open water marathon.
As the reigning Olympic champion in the 1500m freestyle, he failed to defend his gold medal, finishing in fourth place.

Finishing off the year in December, Paltrinieri competed at the Abu Dhabi Aquatics Festival, held in relation to the 2021 World Short Course Championships, winning a gold medal with his Italy relay teammates in the open water 4×1500 metre mixed relay event. On the fifth day of the World Championships, Paltrinieri ranked fourth in the prelims heats of the 1500 metre freestyle, qualifying for the final with a time of 14:28.11. The following day he placed fourth in the final of the 1500 metre freestyle in 14:21.00. Paltrinieri also participated in a beach clean-up at Al Bahia Beach the week of World Championships competition to help protect the natural habitat of the hawksbill sea turtle.

2022
On the first day of competition on the first leg of the 2022 Marathon Swim World Series, held in May at Albarquel in Setúbal, Portugal, Paltrinieri won the gold medal in the 10 kilometre swim, swimming through waves and currents to finish first in 1 hour, 53 minutes, and 45 seconds. The second and final day, he helped win the silver medal in the 4×1500 metre mixed gender open water relay, anchoring the second Italy relay team across the finish line only behind the first Italy relay team.

2022 World Aquatics Championships

At the 2022 World Aquatics Championships, held in Budapest, Hungary, he ranked fourth in the 800 metre freestyle preliminaries on the third day of pool swimming competition at Danube Arena, advancing to the final with a time of 7:46.24. In the final the following day, he placed fourth with a time of 7:41.19. He swam a 14:54.56 in the preliminaries of the 1500 metre freestyle three days later, ranking seventh and qualifying for the final. With a European record, Italian record, and Championships record time of 14:32.80 in the final, he won the gold medal. The following day, he started open water swimming competition with the mixed 6 kilometre team relay, helping win the bronze in a final relay time of 1:04:43.0. On the second day of open water competition, he won the silver medal in the 5 kilometre swim, finishing less than four seconds behind the gold medalist, Florian Wellbrock of Germany, in a time of 52 minutes, 52.7 seconds. Two days later, he won the gold medal in the 10 kilometre open water swim with a time of 1:50:56.8, which was less than two seconds ahead of silver medalist and fellow Italian Domenico Acerenza.

Ten days after he concluded his competition at the World Championships, Paltrinieri won the 10 kilometre swim with a time of 1:51:37.85 at the second leg of the 2022 Marathon Swim World Series, held at Parc de la Villette in Paris, France. The second day of the leg, he helped achieve a time of 1:07:51.74 in the 4×1500 metre team relay and win the gold medal.

2022 European Aquatics Championships
Day two of the 2022 European Aquatics Championships, held in Rome in August, Paltrinieri ranked third in the preliminaries of the 800 metre freestyle, qualifying for the final with a time of 7:48.91. In the final, the next day, he finished in a Championships record time of 7:40.86, sharing the podium with silver medalist Lukas Märtens of Germany and bronze medalist Lorenzo Galossi, also of Italy. On the fifth day, he swam a 15:01.74 in the preliminaries of the 1500 metre freestyle, qualifying for the final ranking third. He finished in a time of 14:39.79 in the final to win the silver medal. The tenth day of competition, he won the gold medal in the 5 kilometre open water swim with a time of 52:13.5. In the 10 kilometre open water swim the next day, he placed seventh with a time of 1:51:12.7. For his final event, the open water mixed team relay later in the day, he swam the third leg of the relay, challenging the third leg swimmer from Hungary, Dávid Betlehem, and contributed to a final time of 59:43.1 to win the gold medal a little over 10 seconds ahead of the team from Hungary.

2022 World Series: Eilat
In Eilat, Israel, in November as part of the fifth and final leg of the Marathon Swim World Series for the year, Paltrinieri helped finish in a time of 1:06:37.00 in the 4×1500 metre mixed open water relay and win the bronze medal. The following day he won the 10 kilometre open water swim with a time of 1:46:41.80, sharing the podium with Marc-Antoine Olivier of France and Dávid Betlehem, and bringing his overall World Series ranking up to first to tie Kristóf Rasovszky of Hungary for the title for the year.

2022 World Short Course Championships

On the first day in Melbourne, Australia, for the 2022 World Short Course Championships contested at the Melbourne Sports and Aquatic Centre, Paltrinieri won the gold medal in the 1500 metre freestyle with a time of 14:16.88. In his other individual event, the first-ever male 800 metre freestyle contested at a World Short Course Championships, he won the inaugural world title and gold medal with a Championships record and personal best time of 7:29.99.

International championships (50 m and open water)

International championships (25 m)

Personal bests

Swimming World Cup circuits
The following medals Paltrinieri has won at Swimming World Cup circuits.

Marathon Swim World Series circuits
Paltrinieri has won the following medals at Marathon Swim World Series circuits.

See also
 Italian swimmers multiple medalists at the international competitions

References

External links
 

1994 births
Living people
Italian male swimmers
Italian male freestyle swimmers
Olympic swimmers of Italy
Sportspeople from Carpi, Emilia-Romagna
Swimmers at the 2012 Summer Olympics
Medalists at the FINA World Swimming Championships (25 m)
European Aquatics Championships medalists in swimming
World Aquatics Championships medalists in swimming
World Aquatics Championships medalists in open water swimming
World record holders in swimming
Olympic gold medalists for Italy
Olympic silver medalists for Italy
Swimmers at the 2016 Summer Olympics
Swimmers at the 2020 Summer Olympics
Medalists at the 2016 Summer Olympics
Medalists at the 2020 Summer Olympics
Olympic gold medalists in swimming
Olympic silver medalists in swimming
Universiade medalists in swimming
European Championships (multi-sport event) bronze medalists
Mediterranean Games gold medalists for Italy
Mediterranean Games medalists in swimming
Swimmers at the 2018 Mediterranean Games
Universiade gold medalists for Italy
Swimmers of Fiamme Oro
Italian male long-distance swimmers
Medalists at the 2017 Summer Universiade
20th-century Italian people
21st-century Italian people